Tosh Berman is a writer and poet whose work often focuses on figures of post-war France such as Jacques Mesrine, Serge Gainsbourg and Boris Vian. Berman also founded the publishing house TamTam Books where he works as a publisher and editor. He also works as a buyer for the independent, Los Angeles-based book store Book Soup. His parents were the 60s icons Wallace Berman and Shirley Berman.

Selected works  
 Sparks-Tastic: Twenty-One Nights with Sparks in London, (Rare Bird Books, 2013) 
 The Plum in Mr. Blum's Pudding, (Penny-Ante, 2014) 
 Tosh: Growing Up in Wallace Berman's World, (City Lights, 2019)

References 

Living people
21st-century American poets
Place of birth missing (living people)
Year of birth missing (living people)
American company founders
American publishers (people)
American copy editors
Writers from Los Angeles